3350 or variant, may refer to:

In general
 A.D. 3350, a year in the 4th millennium CE
 3350 BC, a year in the 4th millennium BCE
 3350, a number in the 3000 (number) range

Other uses
 3350 Scobee, an asteroid in th Asteroid Belt, the 3350th asteroid registered
 IBM 3350, a hard disk drive unit
 Nokia 3350, a cellphone
 Texas Farm to Market Road 3350, a state highway
 Wright R-3350 Duplex-Cyclone, an American radial aircraft engine displacing nearly 3,350 cubic inches

See also